Mount Union may refer to some places in the United States:

 Mount Union, Iowa
 Mount Union, Pennsylvania
 Mount Union, Virginia
 University of Mount Union, a liberal arts university in Alliance, Ohio
 Mount Union (Arizona), a mountain in the Bradshaw Mountains